Aahana Kumra is an Indian feature film, television, and theatre actress. Kumra is known for her small screen debut in Sony Entertainment Television's Yudh with Amitabh Bachchan and also for her lead role in the TV series Agent Raghav - Crime Branch with Sharad Kelkar, followed by leading roles in a number of feature films.

Early life

Kumra was born and brought up in Lucknow. She had an inclination towards acting since childhood when she began theatre roles.

Career
In 2013, Kumra was cast in the television series Yudh - a 20-episode show starring Amitabh Bachchan in which Kumra plays the pivotal role of Bachchan's daughter. Later, she starred in Agent Raghav – Crime Branch, a biweekly television crime thriller show, as the female lead Agent Trisha Dewan opposite Sharad Kelkar. Kumra won Best Actress Award at the Third Moida International Awards for her short film Siberia. She made her Hindi feature film debut in Sona Spa in 2013,  and her Tulu feature film debut in 2015 in Kudla Cafe. She hosted the Pro Kabbadi 2016 series. In 2017, Kumra had a leading role in the black comedy film Lipstick Under My Burkha as Leela. The following year she portrayed the role of Priyanka Gandhi in the political biography film The Accidental Prime Minister.

Filmography

Films

Television

Web series

Awards and nominations

References

External links 

 

Living people
Actresses from Lucknow
Indian film actresses
Indian television actresses
Indian web series actresses
Actresses in Hindi cinema
Actresses in Tulu cinema
Actresses in Hindi television
21st-century Indian actresses
Year of birth missing (living people)